The 1989–90 NBA season was the 76ers 41st season in the National Basketball Association, and 27th season in Philadelphia. During the off-season, the Sixers acquired Rick Mahorn from the expansion Minnesota Timberwolves, who selected him in the 1989 NBA expansion draft. Mahorn, who won a championship with the Detroit Pistons last year, joined Charles Barkley and Mike Gminski to form a formidable front court. The team also acquired Johnny Dawkins from the San Antonio Spurs, who teamed with second-year star Hersey Hawkins in the backcourt. After a mediocre 18–16 start to the season, the Sixers would win twelve consecutive games, then hold a 30–18 record at the All-Star break, and post an 8-game winning streak near the end of the season. They won the Atlantic Division title compiling a 53–29 record, defeating the Boston Celtics by just one game. 

Barkley averaged 25.2 points, 11.5 rebounds and 1.9 steals per game, and was named to the All-NBA First Team, and selected for the 1990 NBA All-Star Game, while Hawkins averaged 18.5 points and 1.6 steals per game, and Dawkins provided the team with 14.3 points, 7.4 assists and 1.5 steals per game. In addition, sixth man Ron Anderson contributed 11.9 points per game off the bench, while Gminski provided with 13.7 points, 8.5 rebounds and 1.3 blocks per game, and Mahorn averaged 10.8 points and 7.6 rebounds per game, and was named to the NBA All-Defensive Second Team. 

In the Eastern Conference First Round of the playoffs, the Sixers would win a hard-fought five game series over the Cleveland Cavaliers, then would lose in the Eastern Conference Semi-finals to the Chicago Bulls four games to one.

Barkley also finished second in the league's MVP voting behind Magic Johnson. Barkley received more first-place votes (38 of the 92 cast) than Johnson (27), but totaled only 614 points compared to Johnson's 636. This was the only time in NBA history where the player with the most first-place votes for MVP did not get the award.

Draft picks

Roster

Regular season

Season standings

z - clinched division title
y - clinched division title
x - clinched playoff spot

Record vs. opponents

Game log
Reference

Playoffs

|- align="center" bgcolor="#ccffcc"
| 1
| April 26
| Cleveland
| W 111–106
| Charles Barkley (38)
| Charles Barkley (21)
| Johnny Dawkins (9)
| Spectrum15,319
| 1–0
|- align="center" bgcolor="#ccffcc"
| 2
| April 29
| Cleveland
| W 107–101
| Charles Barkley (32)
| Rick Mahorn (9)
| Johnny Dawkins (11)
| Spectrum18,168
| 2–0
|- align="center" bgcolor="#ffcccc"
| 3
| May 1
| @ Cleveland
| L 95–122
| Hersey Hawkins (19)
| Charles Barkley (11)
| Johnny Dawkins (7)
| Richfield Coliseum16,317
| 2–1
|- align="center" bgcolor="#ffcccc"
| 4
| May 3
| @ Cleveland
| L 96–108
| Charles Barkley (23)
| Barkley, Mahorn (11)
| Johnny Dawkins (10)
| Richfield Coliseum17,106
| 2–2
|- align="center" bgcolor="#ccffcc"
| 5
| May 5
| Cleveland
| W 113–97
| Hersey Hawkins (39)
| Charles Barkley (19)
| Johnny Dawkins (14)
| Spectrum18,168
| 3–2
|-

|- align="center" bgcolor="#ffcccc"
| 1
| May 7
| @ Chicago
| L 85–96
| Charles Barkley (30)
| Charles Barkley (20)
| three players tied (4)
| Chicago Stadium18,676
| 0–1
|- align="center" bgcolor="#ffcccc"
| 2
| May 9
| @ Chicago
| L 96–101
| Hersey Hawkins (23)
| Charles Barkley (19)
| Johnny Dawkins (13)
| Chicago Stadium18,676
| 0–2
|- align="center" bgcolor="#ccffcc"
| 3
| May 11
| Chicago
| W 118–112
| Charles Barkley (34)
| Charles Barkley (20)
| Charles Barkley (8)
| Spectrum18,168
| 1–2
|- align="center" bgcolor="#ffcccc"
| 4
| May 13
| Chicago
| L 101–111
| Hersey Hawkins (26)
| Charles Barkley (13)
| Hersey Hawkins (6)
| Spectrum18,168
| 1–3
|- align="center" bgcolor="#ffcccc"
| 5
| May 16
| @ Chicago
| 99–117
| Ron Anderson (20)
| Charles Barkley (13)
| Johnny Dawkins (15)
| Chicago Stadium18,676
| 1–4
|-

Player statistics

Playoffs

Awards and records
 Charles Barkley, All-NBA First Team
 Rick Mahorn, NBA All-Defensive Second Team

See also
 1989–90 NBA season

References

Philadelphia 76ers seasons
Philadelphia
Philadelphia
Philadelphia